Balseros is a 2002 Catalan documentary co-directed by Carles Bosch and Josep Maria Domènech about Cubans leaving during the Período Especial.

As a consequence of the widespread poverty that came with the end of economic support from the former USSR, 37,191 Cubans left Cuba in 1994, unimpeded by the Cuban government, using anything they could find or build to get to Florida in the United States. Most left with improvised rafts, which were often not seaworthy, and some even hijacked a ferry.

The documentary consists largely of interviews with the rafters ("Balseros"), over the course of seven years the lives of seven of those refugees, from the building of their rafts to their attempts at building new lives in the United States, giving insight into daily life in Cuba and the US in those days.

The documentary is 2 hours long. The first half is filmed in Cuba, with in the end some scenes of the rafters' months long detention in Guantanamo Bay, where lotteries were used to decide who would be allowed to go to the US. All the while, their families didn't know their whereabouts. The last hour is about the lives of those who got to the USA. These people were filmed again five years later, showing their difficulties adapting to a new type of society and the resulting homesickness, a "human adventure of people who are shipwrecked between two worlds".

Reception

Critical response
Balseros has an approval rating of 88% on review aggregator website Rotten Tomatoes, based on 24 reviews, and an average rating of 7.46/10. The website's critical consensus states, "Patient and persuasive in its approach, Balseros puts a human face on the struggle to survive in 21st century Cuba -- and the dangerous battle to find a better life elsewhere". Metacritic assigned the film a weighted average score of 73 out of 100, based on 14 critics, indicating "generally favorable reviews".

Awards
Best Foreign Documentary and Memory Documentary Award at the Festival Internacional del Nuevo Cine Latinoamericano, Havana,  2002
Best Documentary in Spanish Language at the Ajijic Festival Internacional de Cine, Mexico, 2002
Winner of the IDA Awards (International Documentary Association), 2003
Nominated for an Academy Award. 2004 
Winner of the Peabody Awards, 2004
Winner of an Emmy Award for Cinematography by Josep Maria Domènech (Best Photography), 2005
Nominated for Best Documentary, Goya awards. 2003

Specs
Produced by: Bausan Films & TVC
Directors: Carles Bosch & Josep Mª Domènech
Scripts: David Trueba & Carles Bosch
Director de fotografía: Josep Mª Domènech
Producer: Loris Omedes
Executive Producer: Mª José Solera
Executive Producer TVC: Tom Roca
Director of Production: Tono Folguera
Production Manager: Richard Schweid
Music : Lucrecia
Sound: Juan Sánchez "Cuti"
Editing: Ernest Blasi
Graphics: Philip Stanton
Language: Spanish & English
Budget: €770.000

See also 
Balseros

Sources
https://web.archive.org/web/20051215100716/http://www.bausanfilms.com/largo_balseros.htm
https://web.archive.org/web/20051223014857/http://www.zinema.com/pelicula/2002/balseros.htm
https://web.archive.org/web/20100626052534/http://pragda.com/movie/balseros.php

References

External links 
 

Cuba–United States relations
Documentary films about immigration to the United States
Rafting
Documentary films about water transport
2002 films
2002 documentary films
Spanish documentary films
2000s Spanish-language films
Documentary films about refugees
2000s Spanish films